Ras Kouroun, El-Katieh, or El-Kas, also known as Casius Mons in Latin, or Kasion Oros to Greek geographers such as Herodotus (who considered it to mark the boundary between Egypt and Syria), is a small mountain near the marshy Lake Bardawil, the "Serbonian Bog" of Herodotus, where Zeus' ancient opponent Typhon was "said to be hidden". Here, Greeks knew, Baal Sephon was worshipped. 

The sandy mount stands out about the flat landscape, though it is a mere 100 metres above the sea.

Its name is given to the Catholic titular see of Casius.

Like the other Mount Casius in Syria, it was historically associated with a shrine to Zeus, one of whose epithets was Kasios.

Notes

Ancient Greek geography
Mountains of Egypt